Pawn is a 2020 South Korean family friendly drama film, directed by Kang Dae-gyu and produced by Yoon Je-kyoon. The film starring Sung Dong-il, Ha Ji-won, Kim Hee-won and Park So-yi, is a human drama which revolves around two debt collectors, Doo-seok (Sung Dong-il) and Jong-bae (Kim Hee-won), who take nine-year-old girl Seung-yi (Park So-yi) as "collateral" from her mother, an illegal immigrant. 

The film was released in theaters on September 29, 2020. It generally received positive reviews and good ratings. It was number one box office film in South Korea for two weeks.

As of January 2, 2021, Pawn is at 9th place, with gross of US$12.87 million and 1,719,523 admissions, among all the films released in South Korea in the year 2020.

Synopsis

In 1993, Doo-Seok (Sung Dong-il) and Jong-bae (Kim Hee-won) work as debt collectors in Incheon, South Korea. While collecting a debt from Myung-Ja (Yunjin Kim), they take her nine-year-old daughter Seung-Yi (Park So-Yi) as collateral. Myung-Ja is an illegal immigrant and she is deported from South Korea. Suddenly, Doo-Seok and Jong-bae become Seung-Yi's guardians. The two men and the girl eventually form a family-like bond as they live together.

Cast  
 Sung Dong-il as Doo-seok
 Ha Ji-won as Seung-yi
 Park So-yi as young Seung-yi
 Hong Seung-hee as teenage Seung-yi
 Kim Hee-won as Jong-bae
 Kim Jae-hwa as Madam Jeong
 Jin Yoo-young as Minister of state of the Republic of Korea
 Jung In-gi as Translator Noh
 Yoo Soon-woong as Byeong-dal
 Cha Chung-hwa as Byeong-dal's wife
Friendly appearance
 Yunjin Kim as Myung-ja
 Na Moon-hee as Seungi, grandmother

Production

Casting
In March 2019, Sung Dong-il, Ha Ji-won and Yunjin Kim were cast in the film. The script reading was held in April 2019 in presence of Sung Dong-il, Ha Ji-won, Yunjin Kim, Kim Hee-won and child actor Park So-yi.

Filming
Principal photography began in Incheon on April 22, 2019. Filming wrapped up on July 31.

Release
The film was screened at the opening gala of the London Korean Film Festival on October 29, 2020.

Reception

Box office
The film was released on September 29, 2020 on 1342 screens and it has been topping the box office since September 30, according to the Korean Film Council (KOFIC). The film attracted an audience of 1.3 million nationwide as of October 12, 2020.

According to Korean Film Council data, Pawn with gross of US$13.60 million and 1.72 million admissions, ranked at 8th place among all the Korean films released in the year 2020.
 The system of KOBIS (Korean Box Office Information System) is managed by KOFIC.

Critical response

Going by Korean review aggregator Naver Movie Database, the film holds an approval rating of 9.17 from the audience. William Schwartz reviewing Pawn for HanCinema said that the film has  more cuteness than the plot. He criticized the dressing and demeanor of Doo-seok (played by Sung Dong-il) and Jong-bae (played by Kim Hee-won), in the beginning of the film. He opined that the film outshone because of chemistry between the lead actors. The film made people cry, even when editing technique of foreshadowing the plot was used. Further he praised the film for the message it conveyed about non-traditional families and the way period of 1993 was presented.

From September 30, the film, rose to No. 1 in the overall box office, and the real-time reservation rate rose to No. 1. In addition, the CGV Golden Egg Index, which reflects the satisfaction of actual visitors, rose 1% from the previous day to 96%. The Megabox rating was 9.1 points. The Lotte Cinema rating was 8.8 points, which was a high rating compared to films screened in theaters then. The portal site Naver's rating was also 9.48 points, up 0.15 points from the previous day.

Awards and nominations

References

External links
 
 
 
 
 

2020s Korean-language films
2020 films
South Korean drama films
CJ Entertainment films
Films set in 1993
Films set in the 2000s
Films shot in Incheon
Films shot in Busan
Films about adoption
Films postponed due to the COVID-19 pandemic